Korea has an ancient history of cosmetics use, and today it is an important industry in South Korea.

History

Ancient times
Records of the use of cosmetics in Korea date back to the time of the Three Kingdoms of Korea, and the use of makeup flourished during the Goryeo kingdom. Cosmetics were made from lotions extracted from plants, including gourd stems; Ground mung bean contains saponin and was helpful for cleansing. Castor oils and camellia oils were used as hair oil. They had a pleasant smell and were not sticky. To moisturise and add gloss to the skin, safflower oil was used. Apricot and peach oils were used to remove freckles and liver spots. A powder called 'mibun' or 'baekbun' was made from ground rice and millet blended with water or oil.

Scents were added to extracts from grains and other plants, for example from dried clove buds. Perfume was also used to relieve stresses and tiredness. The Gyuhap Chongseo, an ancient women's encyclopedia, includes various methods for making perfume.

According to Gyuhap Chongseo, eyebrows were the central feature of a woman's face. The work describes ten popular eyebrow shapes. Crescent or willow leaf shapes were most popular. Plant ash was the basic raw material used for eyebrow ink, with which women drew their eyebrows in various shapes. The primary colors were black, blue, and dark brown.

Yeonji is the Korean name of rouge, which was used to colour the lips and cheeks. It could be made from safflower.

In the Joseon period, luxurious makeup was forbidden because of Confucianism. Upper-class women tended to copy the makeup and style of gisaeng during this period.

Modern times

Following the Treaty of Kanghwa in 1876, Korean ports opened to foreign trade and Western styles began to influence the country. New makeup styles and products became popular, stimulating Korea's cosmetics culture and enabling mass production and consumption.

Bakgabun, which means Park's powder, was the first mass-produced cosmetics item in Korea. It was the first Korean face powder and was a bestseller from 1916 to 1930. However, because of its lead content, sales then fell rapidly and similar products were quickly launched.

As Korea became a Japanese colony in 1910, Japanese cosmetics dominated and Korean cosmetics failed to develop in the 1920s. After the country was no longer under Japanese control, the Korean War that began in 1950 further disrupted the economy. Finally, around 1961, the Korean cosmetics industry began to prosper after the passage of a law banning sales of other countries' products.

End of the 2010s, South Korea banned cosmetics for which animal testing was conducted.

Contemporary times

Cosmetics and skincare in South Korean culture
Korean people focus on skin care under the influence of TV programs, advertisements and tradition. Koreans highly value even, radiant skin, and Korean women tend to vary their beauty care regimen with the season. They use different kinds of moisturizers such as cream for tightening pores (BB cream, blemish balm or beauty balm) and lotions for lightening the skin (CC cream, colour correction or colour control).

Koreans generally apply makeup every day because it offers sun protection, a major concern. A big focus of Korean skincare is skin lightening,  which is why many Korean cosmetic products have brightening properties. Skin brightening is not the same as skin bleaching, also known as skin whitening, which is a reduction of melanin in the skin. Instead, skin lightening is focused on treating hyperpigmentation.

The Korean Beauty industry is a term that has become popularized across the world and has brought the country an economic advantage. South Korean beauty products are said to be made with natural ingredients such as slime jelly as well as utilizes terms such as “A glass skin” in their packaging and these seem to be the number one factor as to why it has gained immense popularity in Western countries. Korean beauty goes beyond the production of natural maid ingredients, a 10-step skin routine is performed daily by South Koreans to achieve the beautiful pale, glowing skin the country considers to be beautiful. This 10-step skincare routine consists of double- cleansing as its first step in which a cleansing oil is used first and a water-based cleanser follows, this is said to help get rid of any residues in your skin as well helps with circulation in the skin. Exfoliation, clay masks, vitamin C serums to reduce wrinkles, eye cream, and moisturizers are also all part of the routine. Different products or variations of these steps are performed differently depending on the time of day the routine is performed. Sunscreen is only applied if the routine is performed in the morning as is the final and one of the most important steps. It is important to mention that even though this routine is said to be the holy grail for Korean beauty, not everyone follows all 10-steps due to it can be overwhelming and pricey for some.

K- beauty is not all as positive as some may believe, many Korean women living in the country and even in other parts of the world become fixated on their facial appearance due to Korean beauty standards considering a pale, glowing skin to be what makes a woman attractive. As a result of this many beauty products utilize the words whitening or white to appeal to these standards. This has been the mindset that a lot of Korean women have grown up knowing due to these beauty standards that have been around for decades. “Therefore 1 in every 3 Korean women between the ages of 19-29 yrs are said to have undergone facial reconstruction to meet these beauty standards”(Hong, 2019). Though the country's beauty standards are not set to change overnight many advancements and progress in the industry have been made. Advertisers have reduced the promotion of “Glass skin” in their products as well as the industry is also started to be utilized by male consumers. Overall, though Korean beauty has gained popularity through the Korean wave(Lovisa, 2020), and has resulted in a worldwide phenomenon it also can be a negative industry for some.

Korean men are also interested in skincare. Some use BB or CC cream. Cosmetics manufactured specifically for men in South Korea focus on soothing the skin after daily shaving.

Industry 
South Korea is home to several large cosmetic brands, many of which export their products worldwide. They include:

 Amorepacific, with brands including Laneige, Etude House, Innisfree, Sulwhasoo and Mamonde
 LG, with brands including Ĭsa Knox and The Face Shop
 Nature Republic

See also 

Coreana Cosmetic Museum
K-Beauty

References 

Cosmetics
Korean culture